Jumping Branch is an unincorporated community in Summers County, West Virginia, United States, located west of Hinton. The name Jumping Branch originated as settlers had to cross a stream to enter the area by crossing over a fallen tree before it was bridged. The Lilly Crews cemetery is located there as well. Jumping Branch has a post office with ZIP code 25969.

A portion of the Giles-Fayette and Kanawha Turnpike ran through Jumping Branch. The route is unverifiable.

Notable people
Armistead Abraham Lilly, lawyer, businessman, and politician, was born in Jumping Branch.
Jack Whittaker, 2002 Powerball lottery winner, was born in Jumping Branch.

Gallery

References

External links

Unincorporated communities in Summers County, West Virginia
Unincorporated communities in West Virginia